Mars 7, also known as 3MP No.51P was a Soviet spacecraft launched in 1973 to explore Mars. A 3MP bus spacecraft which comprised the final mission of the Mars programme, it consisted of a lander and a coast stage with instruments to study Mars as it flew past. Due to a malfunction, the lander failed to perform a maneuver necessary to enter the Martian atmosphere, missing the planet and remaining in heliocentric orbit along with the coast stage.

Spacecraft 
Mars 7 spacecraft carried an array of instruments to study Mars. The lander was equipped with a thermometer and barometer to determine the surface conditions, an accelerometer and radio altimeter for descent, and instruments to analyse the surface material including a mass spectrometer. The coast stage, or bus, carried a magnetometer, plasma traps, cosmic ray and micrometeoroid detectors, stereo antennae, and an instrument to study proton and electron fluxes from the Sun.

Built by Lavochkin, Mars 7 was the second of two 3MP spacecraft launched to Mars in 1973, having been preceded by Mars 6. Two orbiters, Mars 4 and Mars 5, were launched earlier in the 1973 Mars launch window and were expected to relay data for the two landers. However, Mars 4 failed to enter orbit, and Mars 5 failed after a few days in orbit.

Launch 
Mars 7 was launched by a Proton-K carrier rocket with a Blok D upper stage, flying from Baikonur Cosmodrome Site 81/24. The launch occurred at 17:00:17 UTC on 9 August 1973, with the first three stages placing the spacecraft and upper stage into a low Earth parking orbit before the Blok D fired to propel Mars 7 into heliocentric orbit bound for Mars. The spacecraft performed a course correction on 16 August 1973.

Mars 7's lander separated from the flyby bus on 9 March 1974. Initially, it failed to separate. However, it was eventually released to begin its descent. Known faults with the spacecraft's transistors were blamed for the failure, along with that of Mars 4.

See also
 List of missions to Mars
 Timeline of artificial satellites and space probes

References

Spacecraft launched in 1973
1973 in spaceflight
1973 in the Soviet Union
Mars program
Derelict satellites in heliocentric orbit
4MV